MLE may refer to:

Organizations 
Media Lab Europe, former lab in Dublin, Ireland
Major League Eating, competitive eating organization
Marxistisk-Leninistisk Enhedsforbund, a Danish Maoist group 1972–1975
Military Liaison Element anti-terrorist special forces in US embassies

Science and technology 
Mars Lander Engine of Mars Science Laboratory
Multi-Lamellar Emulsion, in dermatology
Maximum likelihood estimation, in statistics
Managed learning environment, in e-learning
Muconate lactonizing enzyme, in molecular biology
Magazine Lee–Enfield, a rifle
Maleless protein, involved in Dosage compensation in Drosophila, in genetics
An error in Competitive programming meaning Memory Limit Exceeded.
Machine learning engineer, a software engineer who specializes in machine learning

Other uses 
 Magister Legum Europae, i.e. Master of European Law, a European Master's degree in the field of European law 
Multicultural London English, in linguistics
Velana International Airport, Malé, IATA code
Mid-Level Exception, an NBA salary cap exception
Model Law Engineer, a professional designation in the United States